
Kimba may refer to:

People 
Kimba Wood (born 1944), U.S. federal judge
Bouriema Kimba (1968–2013), Nigerian sprinter
Évariste Kimba (1926–1966), Republic of the Congo's Prime Minister in 1965

Places

South Australia
 Kimba, South Australia, a town  and locality
 District Council of Kimba, a local government area
 Kimba Airport

Elsewhere
 Kimba District, District in the Pool Department of Republic of the Congo
 Kimba Payam, South Sudan

Other uses
Kimba language, language in Nigeria
Kimba the White Lion, a manga and anime series by Osamu Tezuka

See also
Kemba (disambiguation)